Nonthaburi United S.Boonmeerit Football Club (Thai สโมสรฟุตบอลนนทบุรี ยูไนเต็ด ส.บุญมีฤทธิ์) is a Thailand semi professional football club based in Nonthaburi. The club is currently playing in the Thai League 3 Bangkok metropolitan region.

Stadium and locations

Season-by-season record

Player

Current players

Honours
Khǒr Royal Cup (ถ้วย ข.)
Winner : 2010

External links
 Official Website
 Official Facebookpage

Association football clubs established in 2011
Football clubs in Thailand
Sport in Bangkok
2011 establishments in Thailand